This article is a list of the legal regulatory bodies that govern telecommunications systems in different countries. 
This list contains bodies ensuring effective regulatory role in a territory which is not necessarily a state, but is listed as "territory" or "economy" in the statistics of international institutions, in particular the International Telecommunication Union (ITU).

By country

International 
 African Telecommunications Union
 Caribbean Association of National Telecommunication Organisations (CANTO)
 Caribbean Telecommunications Union
 Cellular Telecommunications and Internet Association
 Eastern Caribbean Telecommunications Authority (ECTEL)
 European Conference of Postal and Telecommunications Administrations
 International Telecommunications Satellite Organization

Notes

References

 Cellular News - Regulators.
 National Telecommunications Regulatory Authorities (NRAs), (source: OFCOM) 
 Indicators Useful Sites and Links (source: ITU) 
 Websites of regulators in West and Central Africa West and Central African media and telecommunications regulation authorities’ websites 

Regulatory bodies
 Regulatory bodies
Regulatory Authorities
 
Lists of regulatory agencies